Sylvia Schwabe (born 20 December 1962) is a rower who started for East Germany. In October 1986, she was awarded a Star of People's Friendship in gold (second class) for her sporting success.

References

1962 births
Living people
East German female rowers
World Rowing Championships medalists for East Germany